Brenau Downtown Center is an event facility operated by Brenau University in Gainesville, Georgia. 

The facility was originally built as Georgia Mountains Center in 1980 by the City of Gainesville as a multi-purpose facility and featured an 18,000 square foot arena capable of seating up to 2,500 people. The arena had a 24' ceiling height and balcony seating along two walls. In the past it has hosted trade shows, conventions and several televised WCW matches among other social, business, and sporting events. In addition to box office and food service facilities, the Georgia Mountains Center included a 300-seat theater with a 16-foot proscenium and 36' by 27' stage with full fly loft and orchestra pit. Three meeting rooms of various sizes are located within the center, and can seat up to 375 people when utilized together.

In 2013, the Georgia Mountains Center was converted into Brenau Downtown Center. The arena portion of the former Georgia Mountains Center was remodeled into a two-story facility that houses the university's graduate programs in the health sciences like physical therapy. The theater is still open for public use and continue to be a prominent venue for groups like the Georgia Theatre Alliance and the John Jarrard Foundation.

External links
 Website

Sports venues in Georgia (U.S. state)
Gainesville, Georgia
Buildings and structures in Hall County, Georgia